Jan Hlavica (born 17 July 1994) is a Czech football player, who currently plays for FC Zbrojovka Brno as a centre-back.

External links
 Profile at MSFL.cz
 Profile at Florida Tech Athletics
 

1994 births
Living people
Czech footballers
SK Sigma Olomouc players
FC Zbrojovka Brno players
SK Líšeň players
Association football central defenders
1. HFK Olomouc players
MFK Vítkovice players
MFK Vyškov players
Czech National Football League players
Florida Tech Panthers men's soccer players
People from Kelč
Sportspeople from the Zlín Region